The Siata Daina is an Italian car produced by Siata from 1950-1958. The Daina was available as a coupé or a convertible and had custom bodies by Stabilimenti Farina, Bertone and other coach builders.

Performance 
Like all Siata cars, the Daina was based on heavily modified Fiat mechanics. In this case it was the Fiat 1400; the frame was reinforced and shortened while the engine was developed with new head valves, new manifolds, carburetors, and on some models, Abarth exhaust systems. The Daina could be had with a 1.4L (1,395 cc), 1.5L (1,500 cc) or 1.8L (1,817 cc) overhead valve I4 engine, all of which were sourced from Fiat. It featured independent front suspension and a live rear axle with coil springs all around, as well as 4-wheel drum brakes. It could be had with either a 4-speed or 5-speed manual gearbox.

History 

From 1950 to 1958 there were approximately 200 to 250 Daina Series cars produced.  However, only a few of the Series were produced after 1953. Initially a 3 "posti" (seats) coupe and Cabriolet (trasformabile) were  designed and  built in aluminium with steel doors by Stabilimenti Farina. A Limousine and a sportscar named "Rally" were also built in the early days. Towards the end of the production of the Coupe and the Trasformabile a roadster was added to the line at Stab. Farina, the "Gran Sport", a closed version of the Gran Sport was added to the range, the "Sport".  About 20 Daina Sport (coupes) are thought to have been built, at least eight are known to exist today. The Gran Sport comprised most of the Daina Series cars. The Gran Sport had a steel body with an aluminum hood designed by Stabilimenti Farina (3 all aluminum bodied Gran Sports were made as well) but when Stab. Farina closed in 1953, Bertone took over production with both the Sport and the Gran Sport. Furthermore some cars have been built by other coachbuilders. 

The most well known Dainas were the Gran Sport (convertible) versions used in racing, with many calling it the "little Ferrari". The car was built to take part in the International Grand Prix and the Mille Miglia. The Daina's most notable finish was at the 12 Hours of Sebring in 1952 when Dick Irish and Bob Fergus piloted a 1,500 cc Daina Gran Sport to first in class and third overall. 

Wayne Thomas, an English connoisseur of automobiles, said: "Driving a Siata Gran Sport is simply a dream, the problem is that you do not see them around anymore, and whoever owns one keeps it tight. of this car is style, maneuverability and its ability to go like a missile if it is solicited. "

References 

Cars introduced in 1950

Convertibles
Rear-wheel-drive vehicles
Roadsters
Siata vehicles